Caia may refer to:

Places 
 Caia, Mozambique, a town
 Caia District, an administrative district in Mozambique
 Caia (river), a river in Portugal

Other uses 
 Caia (plant), a genus of fossil plants
 Caia (music), a Japanese music group
 Caia van Maasakker (born 1989), Dutch field hockey player
 Capital Allowances for Intangible Assets, an Irish corporate tax avoidance BEPS tool
 Chartered Alternative Investment Analyst, an American financial services qualification

See also 
 Gaia (disambiguation)
 Kaia (disambiguation)